Jessica Becker (born 9 December 1999) is a Luxembourger footballer who plays as a defender for Dames Ligue 1 club Munsbach and the Luxembourg women's national team.

International career
Becker made her senior debut for Luxembourg on 7 October 2018 during a 0–4 friendly loss against Estonia.

References

1999 births
Living people
Women's association football defenders
Luxembourgian women's footballers
Luxembourg women's international footballers